California's 61st State Assembly district is one of 80 California State Assembly districts. It is currently represented by Democrat Jose Medina of Riverside.

District profile 
The district encompasses a section of the Inland Empire in northwestern Riverside County. The district is primarily suburban.

Riverside County – 21.5%
 Highgrove
 Mead Valley – partial
 Moreno Valley
 Perris
 Riverside – 59.6%

Other levels of government
The 61st Assembly District is completely contained within .

Election results from statewide races

List of Assembly Members 
Due to redistricting, the 61st district has been moved around different parts of the state. The current iteration resulted from the 2011 redistricting by the California Citizens Redistricting Commission.

Election results 1992 - present

2020

2018

2016

2014

2012

2010

2008

2006

2004

2002

2000

1998

1996

1994

1992

See also 
 California State Assembly
 California State Assembly districts
 Districts in California

References

External links 
 District map from the California Citizens Redistricting Commission

61
Assembly
Government in Riverside, California
Moreno Valley, California
Perris, California